Trochus firmus is a species of sea snail, a marine gastropod mollusk in the family Trochidae, the top snails.

Description
The size of the adult shell varies between 20 mm and 26 mm. The notably thick, solid shell has a rather conical shape. It is, transversely sulcate. It has a pale green ground, painted with close purple-red streaks above. The base has red-spotted girdles. The whorls are a little subangular above the suture and a little plicate below the sutures, appearing somewhat terraced.  The body whorl is rounded-angulate and passes into the base with a blunt angle.  The sculpture consists of about 7 weak smooth transverse grooves on the upper surface, and about 4 scarcely elevated concentric girdles on the base. The base of the shell is nearly plane, obsoletely cingulate and false-umbilicate. The funnel-shaped pit occupying the place of the umbilicus has a slightly elevated liration. The aperture is rhomboidal. The entirely  simple columella is very oblique.

Distribution
This marine species occurs in the Persian Gulf.

References

 Bosch D.T., Dance S.P., Moolenbeek R.G. & Oliver P.G. (1995) Seashells of eastern Arabia. Dubai: Motivate Publishing. 296 pp.

External links
 World Register of Marine Species
 

firmus
Gastropods described in 1849